Don Patterson (December 26, 1909 – December 12, 1998) was an American producer, animator, and director who worked at various studios during the Golden age of American animation, including Disney,  Pixar Animation Studios, Touchstone Pictures, Silver Screen Partners IV., Metro-Goldwyn-Mayer cartoon studio, DePatie-Freleng Enterprises, Warner Bros.-Seven Arts Animation, Harman-Ising Productions, Walter Lantz Productions, Format Films,  Famous Studios Grantray-Lawrence Animation; UPA, and Hanna-Barbera. He was the older brother of animator Ray Patterson.

Patterson began his career in the early 1930s as an in-betweener at the Charles Mintz Studio, and then moved to the Walter Lantz Studio.

He began working at the Walt Disney Studios in the 1940s, contributing to five theatrical films: Pinocchio, Fantasia, Dumbo, The Three Caballeros and Make Mine Music,  Toontown’s All-Stars to the Rescue.

In the early 1950s, Patterson returned to the Lantz studio and became one of Lantz's four key animators, along with Ray Abrams, Laverne Harding and Paul Smith.

Leonard Maltin says in Of Mice and Magic, Don Patterson was the first of Lantz's animation team to try directing, and he showed great aptitude for the assignment. His shorts are among the best of the early-1950s product, showing deft handling of characters and snappy timing. In 1952 he 'supervised' one of the best Woody Woodpecker cartoons of all time, Termites from Mars." Patterson also directed Hypnotic Hick (1953), Socko in Morocco and Alley to Bali (both 1954).

Patterson won a Golden Award at the 1985 Motion Pictures Screen Cartoonists Awards.

Patterson died on December 12, 1998 at Santa Barbara, California, just 14 days short of 89th birthday.

Filmography

References

External links 

1909 births
1998 deaths
Animators from Illinois
American directors
American animated film directors
American animated film producers
Hanna-Barbera people
Walt Disney Animation Studios people
Metro-Goldwyn-Mayer cartoon studio people
Walter Lantz Productions people